Natasha Oughtred is an English ballerina and retired principal dancer with the Birmingham Royal Ballet.

Biography 
Natasha Oughtred was born in North Cave, a village near Kingston upon Hull in the East Riding of Yorkshire. She began to study dance at the age of 3 with the Skelton Hooper School of Dance in Hull, under the guidance of the Principal Vanessa Hooper, a former soloist of The Royal Ballet.  She has achieved examination passes with the Royal Academy of Dance and the International Dance Teachers' Association.  She later received additional coaching in ballet from Niall McMahon, a former dancer with the Scottish Ballet and artistic director of New English Contemporary Ballet.  After reaching the semi finals of the prestigious Prix de Lausanne, she received a scholarship to continue her training at the upper school of the Royal Ballet School and joined The Royal Ballet company in 2000, eventually being promoted to the rank of Soloist.  Oughtred joined the Birmingham Royal Ballet as a Soloist in 2007.  She was promoted to First Soloist rank in 2008 and was promoted to the most senior rank of Principal in 2009.

Created roles 
 Being and Having Been - Choreographer: Alastair Marriott
 Castle Nowhere - Choreographer: Matjash Mrozewski
 Children of Adam - Choreographer: Alastair Marriott
 Continued - Choreographer: Alastair Marriott
 Frozen - Choreographer: Vanessa Fenton 
 Homage to the Queen - Fire - Choreographer: Christopher Wheeldon
 Knots - Choreographer: Vanessa Fenton 
 Le Baiser de la Fée - The Fairy's Kiss - Choreographer: Michael Corder 
 On Public Display - Choreographer: Vanessa Fenton
 Siren Song - Choreographer: Poppy Ben-David

Repertoire

Royal Ballet
 A Month in the Country - Vera - Choreographer: Sir Frederick Ashton
 La Bayadère - 3rd Solo Shade - Production: Natalia Makarova
 Cinderella - Spring Fairy - Production: Sir Frederick Ashton
 La Fin du Jour - Cerise Couple - Choreographer: Sir Kenneth MacMillan
 Giselle - Moyna - Production: Sir Peter Wright
 Gloria - The Girl - Choreographer: Sir Kenneth MacMillan
 Mayerling - Princess Stephanie and Princess Louise - Choreographer: Sir Kenneth MacMillan
 The Nutcracker - Clara - Choreographer: Sir Peter Wright
 Les Rendezvous - Pas de Trois - Choreographer: Sir Frederick Ashton
 Scenes de Ballet - Spring Fairy - Choreographer: Sir Frederick Ashton
 Sinfonietta - Choreographer: Jirí Kylián
 The Sleeping Beauty - Various Roles - Production: Dame Monica Mason and Christopher Newton 
 The Sleeping Beauty - Various Roles - Production: Natalia Makarova
 Swan Lake - Pas de Trois - Production: Sir Anthony Dowell
 La Sylphide - Pas de Deux - Choreographer: August Bournonville
 The Vertiginous Thrill of Exactitude - Choreographer: William Forsythe

Birmingham Royal Ballet
 Card Game - Two of Diamonds - Choreographer: John Cranko
 Concerto Barocco - Choreographer: George Balanchine
 Coppélia - Prayer - Choreographer: Sir Peter Wright
 Daphnis and Chloë - Chloë - Choreographer: Sir Frederick Ashton
 Giselle - Harvest - Choreography: David Bintley and Galina Samsova
 The Nutcracker - Sugar Plum Fairy & Rose Fairy - Choreographer: Sir Peter Wright
 Paquita - Fourth Solo - Choreographer: Marius Petipa
 The Shakespeare Suite - Juliet - Choreographer: David Bintley
 Swan Lake - Odette/Odile - Choreography: Sir Peter Wright and Galina Samsova
 Take Five - Three to Get Ready - Choreographer: David Bintley

Awards 
 2000 - Genée International Ballet Competition - Royal Academy of Dance - Silver Medal

References 

Living people
People educated at the Royal Ballet School
English ballerinas
People from Kingston upon Hull
Dancers of The Royal Ballet
Birmingham Royal Ballet principal dancers
Year of birth missing (living people)